Kazha is a rock band founded in 2009 by a Japanese singer/songwriter Kazuha Oda and a guitarist Hideki Matsushige, categorized in Hard Rock and sometimes in Heavy Metal. It used to be a 4 piece band but became 3 piece with Kazuha Oda being a bass/vocal.

Band biography 
The band’s name is taken from the vocalist Kazuha Oda's first name. The band was founded in Los Angeles California but debut in Japan with the release of their first EP Breathe Through Your Dreams in September 2009. After the release of the first album Overture, Kazha made their USA debut performing at Asian Heritage Street Celebration in San Francisco California and has been touring around the world; Korea, Europe, Mexico and U.S.A., appearing at various Anime conventions and Festivals including SacAnime, Nan Desu Kan, Phoenix Comicon, and Saboten Con as their musical guest.

Discography
Reflection (2022)
Kazha (2018)
Evolution (2013)
I Still Remember -Single version- (2010)
Overture (2010)
Breathe Through Your Dreams (2009)

Band members

Current members
 Kazuha Oda – Vocals|Bass guitar (2009–present)
 Hideki Matsushige – Guitar (2009–present)

References

External links

Kazha Official MySpace
Kazha Reverbnation

Japanese hard rock musical groups
Japanese alternative rock groups